The Aon Centre is a commercial office building at 1 Willis Street in Wellington, New Zealand, formerly named the BNZ Centre then the State Insurance Building. When completed in 1984, it was the tallest building in New Zealand, overtaking the 87m Quay Tower in Auckland. It is notable for its strong, square, black form, in late International Style modernism, and for a trade dispute which delayed the construction by a decade. It remained the tallest building in New Zealand until 1986, when the 106 meter BNZ Tower opened in Auckland, and is currently the second tallest building in Wellington after the Majestic Centre.

History
The building was designed in the late 1960s and BNZ (Bank of New Zealand) began purchasing land for the building in 1969. Approval to build was granted by the Town Planning Committee on June 14, 1972, after the building codes were rewritten to allow the development "out of common interest." Construction began in 1973, but construction was delayed in part by a labour demarcation dispute with the boilermakers trade union, who claimed the exclusive right of its members to weld the structural steel. The dispute was characteristic of the time, disrupted construction for six years and discouraged construction of steel buildings across the country. In response to the problem, the government of the day deregistered the boilermakers union. The dispute would lead the building to be four times over budget, ultimately costing $93 million.

In 1979, the original building contract was terminated and a new contract to finish the building was signed in 1981. The complex was completed and occupied in late 1984. After the BNZ moved its head office to Auckland in 1998, State Insurance purchased the naming rights to the building, renaming it the State Insurance Tower.

In 2018, insurance brokerage Aon purchased the naming rights to the building, naming it the Aon Centre. Aon have been tenants in the building since 2013.

Design
The building has black windows on black Brazilian tijuca granite. It has a square footprint and all sides rise vertically without variation. Members of the BNZ development team travelled with Stephenson & Turner Architects to view architecture in the USA, Europe and Australia.

The building draws inspiration from Mies Van de Rohe’s Tower Buildings (Lakeshore Drive Apartment Buildings in Chicago and Seagram Tower in New York) and Yuncken Freeman's BHP Building in Melbourne. The building's design has been criticised, with architect Sir Ian Athfield calling it "Darth Vader's pencil box".

Standing at 103 metres, with 27 floors, it was New Zealand’s tallest building from 1984 to 1986, eclipsed by buildings such as Auckland's BNZ Centre. It was Wellington's tallest building until 1991, when the Majestic Centre was built on the same street.

Underneath the building is a shopping centre and food court. There are also underground passages that travel under Willis Street to the nearby Old Bank and Grand Arcades.

Above ground the tower is accessed by a two-storey high lobby, surrounded by clear glass in stainless steel framework. The BNZ originally occupied three levels with their branch office, and the top seven floors with their head office.

Because of its sheer size and steel construction the building is relatively flexible. Its response to earthquakes is relatively good. Of greater effect is Wellington’s wind which is accommodated by the building’s ability to flex by up to 300 mm in hurricane-force winds. The seismic and wind-resisting frames of the building consist of a steel “tube” built around the perimeter of the tower connected via floor diaphragms to the stiffer central core.

See also
List of tallest structures in New Zealand

References

External links
Entry on Emporis
Day Out New Zealand
National Library of New Zealand - BNZ Centre

Buildings and structures in Wellington City
Skyscrapers in Wellington
1980s architecture in New Zealand
Skyscraper office buildings in New Zealand
Office buildings completed in 1984
Wellington Central, Wellington